Das klagende Lied (Song of Lamentation) is a cantata by Gustav Mahler, composed between 1878 and 1880 and greatly revised over the next two decades. In its original form, Das klagende Lied is the earliest of his works to have survived (a fragment, the Piano Quartet movement in A minor, is believed to date from 1876).

Compositional history 

Mahler began to write the text of Das klagende Lied (possibly basing it on the fairy-tale of the same name by Ludwig Bechstein and/or "Der singende Knochen" ("The Singing Bone") by Jacob and Wilhelm Grimm) during the early part of his final year in the Vienna Conservatory, where he was a student between 1875 and 1878. The draft text for the work is dated 18 March 1878, and composition of the music began in autumn of 1879 and was completed on 1 November 1880. The work is laid out on a very large and complex scale, requiring a large orchestra and taking 60–70 minutes to perform in full.

As originally composed, Das klagende Lied was in three parts:

 Waldmärchen (Forest Legend)
 Der Spielmann (The Minstrel)
 Hochzeitsstück (Wedding Piece)

The first performance did not take place until 1901, by which time Mahler had subjected his original score to several major revisions. The first revision of the work took place in the second half of 1893. This featured a significant reduction and re-arrangement of the orchestral and vocal forces, with the number of harps in the first part being reduced from six to two, and the vocal soloists from eleven to four. The boys’ voices were also removed. The off-stage orchestra, which had played an important role in the original score, was also completely removed from the second and third parts. In spite of having lavished such detailed effort on revising the work's first part, Mahler then decided (Autumn 1893) to omit it completely.

Further revisions to what was now a work in two parts (after the omission of the original first part) were made between September and December 1898. At this point, Mahler’s previous decision to remove the off-stage brass was reversed. The 1898 revisions were in fact so extensive that Mahler had to write out an entirely new manuscript score.

Performance and recording history 

The first performance of Das klagende Lied took place on 17 February 1901 in Vienna, with Mahler himself conducting. It was in this two-part version that the work was published and entered the repertoire. Once the manuscript of the original three-part version came to light in 1969, however, the earlier score came to be regularly performed and recorded as well. The score of the three-part version was published as part of the Gustav Mahler Edition in 1997.

Instrumentation 

Woodwinds
 3 flutes (2nd and 3rd doubling on piccolo)
 2 oboes
 English horn
 2 clarinets in B (both also in A, C and E flat)
 Bass clarinet in B (doubling as 3rd clarinet in B or C)
 3 bassoons (3rd doubling on double bassoon)

Brass
 4 horns
 4 trumpets in F
 3 trombones
 tuba

Percussion for 4 percussionists
 triangle
 cymbals
 tamtam
 bass drum
 timpani

 String instruments
 2 harps
 strings

Offstage Orchestra
 piccolo
 2 flutes (preferably flutes in D)
2 oboes
 2 clarinets in E
 2 clarinets in B
 4 horns in F
 2 trumpets in B (possible on flugelhorn)
 timpani
 triangle
 cymbals

Vocals
 mixed choir (SATB)
 vocal soloists: soprano, contralto, tenor, baritone, boy soprano, boy alto.

Synopsis 
Part I: Waldmärchen (Forest Legend)

A beautiful yet scornful queen decides to hold a contest, the winner of which will be awarded her hand in marriage. The knight who finds a red flower in the forest, she announces, will be judged the winner. Two brothers in particular, one kind and chivalrous, the other wicked and blasphemous, venture into the thicket to find the elusive flower. The gallant brother quickly finds the flower, places it in his cap, and dozes off in the field. Coming upon this scene, the wayward brother draws his sword and kills his sibling, seizing the flower for himself.

Part II: Der Spielmann (The Minstrel)

A minstrel, wandering through the forest, stumbles across a bleached bone in the shade of a willow tree and carves it into a flute. The slain brother sings through the flute, telling the minstrel the details of his unfortunate death. The minstrel resolves to find the queen and inform her of what he has learned.

Part III: Hochzeitsstück (Wedding Piece)

On the same day the minstrel is to arrive at the castle to divulge his discovery, a celebration in honour of the queen's marriage takes place. The murderer-knight, quiet and pale, reflects morbidly on his rash course of action. The minstrel arrives and plays the slain knight's bone-flute. The king-to-be confiscates the flute, but upon playing it himself is accused by his brother of ending his life early for an unjust reason. Pandemonium ensues: the queen faints, the partygoers flee, and the castle collapses.

External links 
 Full text with translations at the LiederNet Archive
 Full Score from the International Music Score Library Project
 
 Youtube video of Das Klagende Lied accompanied by story illustrations

Cantatas
Compositions by Gustav Mahler
1880 compositions
Songs based on fairy tales
Music based on European myths and legends